James Jenkins (born August 17, 1967) is a former American football tight end who played for ten seasons in the National Football League (NFL) for the Washington Redskins as a blocking specialist on offense, winning Super Bowl XXVI during the 1991 season.  Jenkins attended Curtis High School.  He played college football for Rutgers University.  While undrafted, Joe Gibbs made a personal appeal to Jenkins to not join the Army and concentrate on professional football instead. After working as an NFL strength and conditioning coach, he worked as a State Trooper for VA State Police, where he earned several performance awards for DUI enforcement.   He coached several teams in Germany and was the head coach of the Düsseldorf Panthers, a German division I football team.  Previously he was employed as a personal training manager for LifeTime Fitness in Sugarloaf, Georgia.

See also
 List of Rutgers University people

References

External links
 Football Database entry for Jenkins

1967 births
Living people
American football tight ends
Rutgers Scarlet Knights football players
Washington Redskins players
Sportspeople from Staten Island
Players of American football from New York City
Curtis High School alumni
American expatriate sportspeople in Germany
Ed Block Courage Award recipients